This is a list of notable Jewish American mathematicians.  For other Jewish Americans, see Lists of Jewish Americans.

 Abraham Adrian Albert (1905-1972), abstract algebra
 Kenneth Appel (1932-2013), four-color problem 
 Lipman Bers (1914-1993), non-linear elliptic equations
 Paul Cohen (1934-2007), set theorist; Fields Medal (1966)
 Jesse Douglas (1897-1965), mathematician; Fields Medal (1936), Bôcher Memorial Prize (1943)
 Samuel Eilenberg (1913-1988), category theory; Wolf Prize (1986), Steele Prize (1987)
 Yakov Eliashberg (born 1946), symplectic topology and partial differential equations
 Charles Fefferman (born 1949), mathematician; Fields Medal (1978), Bôcher Prize (2008)
 William Feller (1906-1970), probability theory 
 Michael Freedman (born 1951), mathematician; Fields Medal (1986)
 Hillel Furstenberg (born 1935), mathematician; Wolf Prize (2006/07), Abel Prize (2020)
 Michael Golomb (1909-2008), theory of approximation 
 E. Morton Jellinek (1890-1963), biostatistician 
 Edward Kasner (1878-1955), mathematician 
 Sergiu Klainerman (born 1950),  hyperbolic differential equations and general relativity, MacArthur Fellow (1991),  Guggenheim Fellow (1997), Bôcher Memorial Prize(1999) 
 Cornelius Lanczos (1893-1974), mathematician and mathematical physicist 
 Peter Lax (born 1926), mathematician; Wolf Prize (1987), Steele Prize (1993), Abel Prize (2005)
 Emma Lehmer (1906-2007), mathematician 
 Grigory Margulis (born 1946), mathematician; Fields Medal (1978), Wolf Prize (2005), Abel Prize (2020)
 John von Neumann (1903-1957), mathematician 
 Ken Ribet (born 1948), algebraic number theory and algebraic geometry
 Peter Sarnak (born 1953), analytic number theory; Pólya Prize (1998), Cole Prize (2005), Wolf Prize (2014)
 Yakov Sinai (born 1935), dynamical systems; Wolf Prize (1997), Steele Prize (2013), Abel Prize (2014)
 Isadore Singer (1924-2021), mathematician; Bôcher Prize (1969), Steele Prize (2000), Abel Prize (2004)
 Robert M. Solovay (born 1938), mathematician; Paris Kanellakis Award (2003)
 Elias Stein (1931-2018), harmonic analysis; Wolf Prize (1999), Steele Prize (2002)
 Edward Witten (born 1951), theoretical physics; Fields Medal (1990)

See also
 List of Jewish mathematicians

References

+Jewish
+Mathematicians
American Jewish
Mathematicians